Bob Dawson  (born February 18, 1966) is a former American football defensive back who played seven seasons in the Canadian Football League with the Hamilton Tiger-Cats, Memphis Mad Dogs and Ottawa Rough Riders. He was drafted by the Pittsburgh Steelers of the National Football League (NFL) in the eleventh round of the 1988 NFL Draft. Dawson played college football at University of Illinois at Urbana–Champaign. He was the Hamilton Tiger-Cats Most Outstanding Rookie in 1990.

References

External links
Just Sports Stats
Fanbase profile
CFLapedia
College stats

Living people
1966 births
Players of American football from Sacramento, California
Players of Canadian football from Sacramento, California
American football defensive backs
Canadian football defensive backs
African-American players of American football
African-American players of Canadian football
Illinois Fighting Illini football players
Hamilton Tiger-Cats players
Memphis Mad Dogs players
Ottawa Rough Riders players
Sacramento City Panthers football players
21st-century African-American people
20th-century African-American sportspeople